Tuco may refer to:
 Tuco (mountain), a summit in the mountain range Cordillera Blanca, Peru
 El Tuco, Mauricio Alfaro, (born 13 Feb 1956), a Salvadoran footballer and coach.
 Tuco Ramirez, a character played by Eli Wallach in the 1966 Italian film The Good, the Bad and the Ugly
 Tuco Salamanca, a character played by Raymond Cruz in the Breaking Bad franchise
 A name used in South American countries to denote a ragù-like sauce used in pasta dishes. The tuco name comes from the Ligurian tuccu.

See also
Tuco-tuco, a species of South American rodent
Tuko